André Mourlon (9 October 1903 – 31 July 1970) was a French sprinter who competed at the 1924 and 1928 Summer Olympics in the 100 m, 200 m and 4×100 metre relay. He finished in fourth-fifth place in the relay and failed to reach the finals of his individual events. His elder brother René was also an Olympic sprinter.

References

External links
 

1903 births
1970 deaths
Athletes (track and field) at the 1924 Summer Olympics
Athletes (track and field) at the 1928 Summer Olympics
French male sprinters
Olympic athletes of France
Athletes from Paris
20th-century French people